The Roman Catholic Diocese of Inhambane is a diocese located in the city of Inhambane in the Ecclesiastical province of Maputo in Mozambique.

History
 August 3, 1962: Established as Diocese of Inhambane from Metropolitan Archdiocese of Lourenço Marques

Special churches
The Cathedral is Catedral da Nossa Senhora da Conceição (Cathedral of Our Lady of the Immaculate Conception) in Inhambane.

Bishops
 Bishops of Inhambane (Roman rite)
 Bishop Ernesto Gonçalves Costa, O.F.M. (27 October 1962 – 23 December 1974)
 Bishop Alberto Setele (20 November 1975 – 7 September 2006)
 Bishop Adriano Langa, O.F.M. (7 September 2006 – 4 April 2022)
 Bishop Ernesto Maguengue (since 4 April 2022)

Coadjutor Bishop
Adriano Langa, O.F.M. (2005-2006)

See also
Roman Catholicism in Mozambique

Sources
 GCatholic.org
 Catholic Hierarchy

Inhambane
Christian organizations established in 1962
Roman Catholic dioceses and prelatures established in the 20th century
1962 establishments in Mozambique
Roman Catholic Ecclesiastical Province of Maputo